Nasakirali ( is a village in the Ozurgeti Municipality of Guria in western Georgia. On 20 October 1905 a small battle took place near the village, between forces of the Republic of Guria and a small band of Cossacks sent to restore Tsarist authority. The Cossacks were repulsed in battle by a number of armed Gurians (between 1,000 and 4,000; sources differ), with fourteen Cossacks being killed. Before further expeditions could be sent, Staroselski and intelligentsia from Tiflis dissuaded Vorontso-Dashkov, who hoped negotiations could continue. An obelisk was built to commemorate the battle in 1965.

References

Bibliography
 
 

Populated places in Ozurgeti Municipality